Seyyed Kandi (also Romanized as Seyyed Kandī) is a village in Meshgin-e Gharbi Rural District, in the Central District of Meshgin Shahr County, Ardabil Province, Iran. At the 2006 census, its population was 63, in 11 families.

References 

Towns and villages in Meshgin Shahr County